Maximus Planudes (Máximos Planoúdēs) was a Byzantine Greek monk, scholar, anthologist, translator, mathematician, grammarian and theologian at Constantinople. Through his translations from Latin into Greek and from Greek into Latin, he brought the Greek East and the Latin West into closer contact with one another. He is now best known as a compiler of the Greek Anthology.

Biography
Maximus Planudes lived during the reigns of the Byzantine emperors Michael VIII and Andronikos II. He was born at Nicomedia in Bithynia in 1260, but the greater part of his life was spent in Constantinople, where as a monk he devoted himself to study and teaching. On entering the monastery he changed his original name Manuel to Maximus.

Planudes possessed a knowledge of Latin remarkable at a time when Rome and Italy were regarded with some hostility by the Greeks of the Byzantine Empire. To this accomplishment he probably owed his selection as one of the ambassadors sent by emperor Andronikos II in 1295–96 to remonstrate with the Venetians for their attack upon the Genoese settlement in Galata near Constantinople. A more important result was that Planudes, especially by his translations, paved the way for the revival of the study of Greek language and literature in western Europe.

He was the author of numerous works, including: a Greek grammar in the form of question and answer, like the Erotemata of Manuel Moschopulus, with an appendix on the so-called "Political verse"; a treatise on syntax; a biography of Aesop and a prose version of the fables; scholia on certain Greek authors; two hexameter poems, one a eulogy of Claudius Ptolemaeus— whose Geography was rediscovered by Planudes, who translated it into Latin— the other an account of the sudden change of an ox into a mouse; a treatise on the method of calculating in use amongst the Indians; and scholia to the first two books of the Arithmetic of Diophantus.

His numerous translations from the Latin included Cicero's Somnium Scipionis with the commentary of Macrobius; Ovid's Heroides and Metamorphoses; Boethius' De consolatione philosophiae; and Augustine's De trinitate. Traditionally, a translation of Julius Caesar's De Bello Gallico has been attributed to Planudes, but this is a much repeated mistake. These translations were not only useful to Greek speakers but were also widely used in western Europe as textbooks for the study of Greek.

It is, however, for his edition of the Greek Anthology that he is best known. This edition, the Anthology of Planudes or Planudean Anthology, is shorter than the Heidelberg text (the Palatine Anthology), and largely overlaps it, but contains 380 epigrams not present in it, normally published with the others,  either as a sixteenth book or as an appendix.

J. W. Mackail in his book Select Epigrams from the Greek Anthology, has this to add of him:

Among his works were translations into Greek of Augustine's City of God and Caesar's Gallic War. The restored Greek Empire of the Palaeologi was then fast dropping to pieces. The Genoese colony of Pera usurped the trade of Constantinople and acted as an independent state; and it brings us very near the modern world to remember that Planudes was the contemporary of Petrarch.

He is recorded as one of the first people to use the word "million".

Notes

References

Sources
 
 Editions include: Fabricius, Bibliotheca graeca, ed. Harles, xi. 682; theological writings in Migne, Patrologia Graeca, cxlvii; correspondence, ed. M Treu (1890), with a valuable commentary
  (Also Oxford Reference Online.)
  (Also Oxford Reference Online.)
 K. Krumbacher, Geschichte der byzantinischen Litteratur (1897)
 J. E. Sandys, History of Classical Scholarship (1906), vol. i

External links
 
 Planudes from Charles Smith's Dictionary of Greek and Roman Biography and Mythology (1867), v. 3, pp. 384–390
 Select Epigrams from the Greek Anthology  by J. W. Mackail (Project Gutenberg)
 The Greek Anthology, books 1–6, translated by W. R. Paton, with facing Greek text (Loeb Classical Library, 1916)

1260s births
1330 deaths
13th-century Byzantine people
14th-century Byzantine people
14th-century Byzantine writers
Byzantine grammarians
Byzantine writers
Byzantine theologians
Latin–Greek translators
Greek–Latin translators
Greek Renaissance humanists
Greek Christian monks
13th-century Byzantine writers
14th-century Eastern Orthodox theologians
13th-century Eastern Orthodox theologians
13th-century translators
People from the Black Sea Region
Ambassadors
13th-century Greek people
14th-century Greek people
13th-century Greek scientists
13th-century Greek educators
14th-century Greek scientists
14th-century Greek educators
13th-century Greek mathematicians
14th-century Greek mathematicians
13th-century Greek astronomers
14th-century Greek astronomers
People from İzmit